{{DISPLAYTITLE:C13H13NO4}}
The molecular formula C13H13NO4 (molar mass: 247.25 g/mol, exact mass: 247.0845 u) may refer to:

 CPCCOEt
 CX614

Molecular formulas